Father Dmitry Arkadjevich Bagin (German: Martirij Bagin) (born 1956) is a Russian-Greek Catholic priest.

Biography

Bagin was born in Moscow in 1956. He graduated from the Gnesin School of Music. In 1977, he was tonsured a monk with the name Martyrios, and was ordained as a deacon. Bagin graduated from the Moscow Theological Seminary and the Moscow Theological Academy, receiving the title 'Candidate of Theology'. In 1986 he was ordained priest, serving in the Moscow diocese. Since 1989, Bagin was head of the Moscow church of Nativity in Kapotnya, and from 1991, of the Church of All Saints in Kulishki. In September 1998, he was removed from service and temporarily banned from serving as an Orthodox priest. In 1999, he joined the Catholic Church, and, in 2000, he was appointed confessor of the Catholic organization Collegium Orientale in Ayhshtatt, Bavaria. In 2010, he was succeeded in that post by Slovak Catholic priest Michal Leshchishin, and was appointed rector of the Russian Greek Catholic Church in Munich. Bagin is also working in Catholic education and religious programs in radio stations.

External links
http://antimodern.wordpress.com/2009/02/17/дмитрий-багин-быв-игумен-мартирий/, Orthodox source
http://antimodern.wordpress.com/2010/09/30/bagin-2/, Orthodox source

http://kuraev.ru/smf/index.php?topic=90797.70;imode, Orthodox source

Converts to Eastern Catholicism from Eastern Orthodoxy
Former Russian Orthodox Christians
Russian Eastern Catholics
1956 births
Living people